William High Keim (June 13, 1813 – May 18, 1862) was a Republican member of the U.S. House of Representatives from Pennsylvania, as well as a general in the Union Army during the American Civil War.

Early life and career
William High Keim (a nephew of George May Keim) was born near Reading, Pennsylvania.  He attended Mount Airy Military School and attained the rank of major general in the state militia.

Keim served as Mayor of Reading in 1848.  Keim was elected as a Republican to the Thirty-fifth Congress to fill a short term vacancy caused by the resignation of J. Glancy Jones after Jones's defeat in the election of 1858. He was surveyor general of Pennsylvania from 1860 to 1862.

Civil War
During the Civil War, Keim enlisted in the Union Army for a term of 3 months and, due primarily to his political ties to Governor Andrew Curtin, he was commissioned as a major general of Pennsylvania Volunteers on April 20, 1861. His original term of enlistment having expired, he was honorably mustered out on July 21, 1861, and returned to Reading.

As the war lengthened and it became evident that a quick victory was not in sight, Keim decided to re-enlist, this time for a term of 3 years.  Governor Curtin commissioned him as a brigadier general of volunteers on December 20, 1861. However, Keim died of typhus while in the military service at Harrisburg, Pennsylvania, in 1862. Interment was in the Charles Evans Cemetery in Reading.

See also
    
Ex parte Merryman  
List of American Civil War generals (Union)

References
 Retrieved on 2008-02-12
The Political Graveyard

1813 births
1862 deaths
Burials at Charles Evans Cemetery
Politicians from Reading, Pennsylvania
Union Army generals
People of Pennsylvania in the American Civil War
Republican Party members of the United States House of Representatives from Pennsylvania
Deaths from typhus
19th-century American politicians
United States politicians killed during the Civil War